Odisha, one of the 28 states of India,
has two basic kinds of forest: in the northeast region of the state the forest is classified as the tropical-moist-deciduous type, blanketing hills, plateaus and other high-altitude isolated areas; in the southwest the tropical-dry-deciduous variety dominate.

Odisha Forest 

Odisha's forests are vast. Out of the total geographical area of 155,707 km2, the State records 52,472 km2 (~33%) as some version of forest. The actual forest cover may be less, according to the Forest Survey of India, rosewood, sal, piasal, teak and haldi. The forest's naturally vigorous growth accounts for a tremendous wealth of biodiversity, filling many catalogues of the wild plant and animal species dwelling within.

The state has declared large parcels of land as protected areas with the purpose being to allow animals and plants who are sensitive to cohabitation with humans places of relative freedom from interference and habitat loss. These protected areas constitute 10.37% of the total forest area and 4.1% of the total geographical area of the state.

Forest flora
The state is home to 3000 plant species including 120 orchid species and 63 varieties of mangrove trees which make the state second largest mangrove ecosystem in India.

A vast variety of other plants are also found in the state, as in the following:
 
Acorous calamus
Aegiceras corniculatus
Alpinia galanga - greater galingal
Androgaphis paniculata
Asparagus racemosus - shatavari
Cathraranthus roseus
Celastrus paniculatus
Centella asiatica
Cissus quadranggularis
Clerodendrum ssp.
Colchicum autumnale - autumn crocus
Commiphora wightii - Mukul myrrh
Croton roxburghjii
Curcuma angustifolia
Digitalis purpurea - common foxglove
Diogenin
Emetin
Ephedra ssp.
Erythroxylon coca - coca
Excoecaria agallochi
Gloriosa superba
Gugulipid
Hemidesmus indicus
Ocimum basilicum
Plumbago zeylanica
Pongamia pinnata
Rauvolfia serpentina - Indian snakeroot
Salvadora persica
seagrass
Taxus brevifolia - Pacific yew
Toddalia asiatica
Vinblastim areteminsinine
Whighina somenifera

Forest fauna
The IUCN Red List has recorded a total of 473 species of birds and 86 species of mammals, 19 species of amphibians and 110 species of reptiles including three crocodilian species. Out of these around 54 species are considered endangered. Home to a variety of wild animals, the state has declared considerable tracts of land as areas protected for these animals only. These protected areas constitute 10.37% of the total forest area and 4.1% of the total geographical area of the state. Not only this, the state also has the distinction of possessing three mass nesting beaches of endangered olive ridley sea turtles which makes it the largest nesting ground of the species.

The state has three mass nesting beaches of endangered olive ridley sea turtles which when combined makes it the world's largest nesting ground for this species.

Indenting Orissa's ocean coast is Chilika lagoon, a semi-saline wetland used by many species of migratory birds, and also which the endangered Irrawaddy dolphin uses as part of its range. In spite of considerable human interactivity here, the rare dolphin survives. The Orissa government is conducting various programs to protect the species.

Other animals that call Orissa home, or part-time home are listed below.

Land animals 

 
Asian elephants ହାଥି
Barking deer
Blackbucksକୃଷ୍ଣ ସାର ମୁର୍ଗ
Buffaloes
Fishing cats
Flying squirrels
Four-horned antelopes
Gaurs
Green sea turtles
Langurs
Leopards
Mongooses
Monitor lizards
Pangolins
Porcupines
Pythons
Sambars
Sloth bears
Slow lorises
Spotted deer
Tigers
Turtles
Wild boars

Avians 

 
Alexandrine parakeets
Asiatic dowitchers
Avocets
Black-headed ibis
Brahminy ducks
Brahminy kites
Collared pratincoles
Coots
Dalmatian pelicans
Dunlins
Egrets
Gadwalls
Geese
Godwits
Goliath herons
Greater flamingos
Grey herons
Grey hornbills ~ Ocyceros
Gull-billed terns ~ Gelochelidon nilotica
Hill mynas ~ Gracula religiosa
Indian pied hornbills ~ Anthracoceros coronatus
Indian trogons ~ Harpactes fasciatus
Jacanas
Jungle fowls
Kestrels
Kingfishers
Lapwings
Larks
Lesser flamingos
Little cormorants
Malabar pied hornbills
Marsh harriers
Moorhens
Night herons
Pallas's fish-eagles
Pariah kites
Peacocks
Peafowls
Peregrine falcons
Pintailss
Plovers
Pochards
Pond herons
Purple herons
Red jungle fowls
River terns
Rollers
Ruffs
Sandpipers
Shovellers
Snipes
Spoonbills
Spoon-billed sandpipers ~ Eurynorhynchus pygmeus
Spot-billed pelicans
Stilts
Storks
Teals
Wagtails
White-bellied sea eagles
Wild ducks

References

 01

F
Forests of India